Eugen-Keidel Tower is a 31-metre-high observation tower location on the Schauinsland mountain near Freiburg, Germany. It was built in 1981. The Eugen-Keidel Tower has an extraordinary design with a triangular cross section.

See also
 List of towers

External links
 
Pictures Schauinslandturm 

Buildings and structures in Baden-Württemberg
Observation towers in Baden-Württemberg